Atlético Clube de Portugal is a Portuguese club, located in the city of Lisbon, more precisely in the parish of Alcântara. It was founded on 18 September 1942 due to the merger of two clubs of Alcântara (Carcavelinhos Football Club) and Santo Amaro (União Foot-Ball Lisboa). Besides Football, the club also has sections of Futsal and Basketball. In the past the club had sections of Field Hockey, Swimming, Sport Fishing, Cycle-Touring, Table Tennis, Rugby, Volleyball, Gymnastics, Triathlon and Handball.

History
Atlético Clube de Portugal is born after two clubs from the western zone of Lisbon, Carcavelinhos and União, decide to join, to create a bigger and stronger club. In order to make the merger official, the members of Carcavelinhos and the União de Lisboa met in a magna session in the cinematographic hall of the Sociedade Promotora de Educação Popular in Alcântara on the night of 18 September 1942.

A decade of great glow 
The first years of the new collective proved to be, also, the years of greater brilliance of the club. With their teams to be made up of athletes from the founding clubs, Atletico had in its early years the most outstanding results in football, also achieving successes in other sports such as basketball and field hockey.

The first official title ends up being the Regional Championship of Lisbon of basketball, conquered soon in its season of debut, in 1942/43, and repeated in the following season. In fact, it would be five Lisbon Championships won by Atletico in its first decade of existence. In addition to these, there would also be the achievements of the Cup of Honor (predecessor of the Portuguese Cup) in 1943/44, a 2nd Division (1943/44) and a Portuguese Cup (1953/54). Rugby, a section made up of former students of the Instituto Superior de Agronomia, would win two Regional Championship of Lisbon.

In the first decade of the club's football, the club achieved its most relevant results, with two appearances in the Portuguese Cup final in 1946, having lost the on both occasions. Two places on the podium of the 1st Division and the conquest of the 2nd Division title in 1944/45, stand as the greatest achievements of Atletico in its history.

In 1945 the club inaugurates its renovated sports park, leaving the designation of Campo da Tapadinha, happening to denominate Estádio da Tapadinha.

In 1951, due to the cultural and athletic work of Atletico, in view of the efforts made in favor of the prestige of National Sports, the Club was awarded the rank of Official of the Military Order of Christ.

Consolidation 
After the initial brilliance, Atlético enters a process of consolidation. In the football team begin to affirm the first players coming from the schools of the club, like Orlando Paulos, Tomé Antunes, Vítor Lopes, Carlos Gomes and, above all, Germano de Figueiredo. There are also players who have made history in Portuguese football like Carlos Gomes, José Henrique, Imbelloni, Castiglia, Messiano, Ben David and many others. However, the club settled in the middle of the 1st Division table, being relegated a few times. Until 1976/77 fell to the 2nd Division and never to return.

The awakening of amateur sports 
In 1972 Atlético inaugurated its poly-sports pavilion, and the decade of 70 and 80 ends up being marked by the achievements of the amateur sports. Basketball, in particular, has spawned a few generations of valiant athletes, and has achieved several titles and standout rankings. Of note are the 3 National U-19 Championships and the 2 U-17 Championships, as well as a 2nd Division with the main team. Atlético became a regular presence among the "big boys" of national basketball, earning the respect of its opponents.

Other sports have benefited from the construction of the Pavilion Engº Santos e Castro, such as women's volleyball (winner of 3 Portuguese Cups and first team to participate in European competitions) and Handball (winner of the 2nd Division).

In 1981, Atlético Clube de Portugal was awarded the status of Public Utility Institution.

Decade of 90 with little brightness 
Football, the main sport of the club, spent the last years of the 20th century on secondary stages. No major highlights. As well as all the other sports, with an honorable exception to futsal, which wins a District Championship and inaugurates the National Championship (where he participated several times in the final stages) and basketball.

In 1992, at the time of the commemorations of the 50th anniversary of the foundation of Atlético, the Lisbon City Council decided to award the Municipal Gold Medal of Merit to the Club, while the Government of the Republic decided to award it with the Medal of Good Sporting Services.

A new glow 
The beginning of the millennium brings new titles for the club's showcases. The senior football team wins the 3rd Division twice, and in 2011 it rises to the 2nd League. In the youth the U-19 win the Lisbon Honor Division in 2006 and, for the first time, the National Championship of the 2nd Division in 2013. The U-17 return to the Nationals for the first time in 15 years in 2014.

Basketball sees its youth team conquer the Under-20 National Cup in 2007. The senior team conquered the National Championship of the 1st Division, third tier of the national Basketball, in a final against Vasco da Gama, in 2013/14, that returned the club to Proliga. Still in Basketball, in the 2015/16 season, Atlético win the 2nd place in the Proliga championship and obtained the sporting right to be present in the League (LPB), right that was not exercised, relegating the team of Tapadinha again to the National Championship of the 1st Division (3rd national level).

The Futsal also lived moments of glory, with the achievement of the Division of Honor of the Lisbon Football Association in 2012/13. The following season, a new promotion, with the club returning to the 2nd National Division, eight years later.

Field Hockey, returned to the club in 2015, would win the National Indoor Hockey Championship in the 2015/16 season.

The Triathlon wins 3 national championships, with Sérgio Marques winning a bronze medal and a silver medal in European Championships.

The club is once again developing water activities, with the concession of Alvito Municipal Pools that are under the management of the club since 2009.

Financial difficulties 
Since the ascent to the 2nd League, Atlético started to have a financial burden that was not accustomed to. The increase in liabilities, together with the regulations of the Portuguese Professional Football League, led the club to approve the formation of a Sports Society in the General Assembly.

With the formation of the Sports Limited Company, at the start of the 2013/14 season, new problems arise, with the Sports Limited Company managing to become incompatible with the club board. In the field, the professional team accumulates bad scores, relegated for 3 consecutive years, being saved by administrative decision in 2013/14 and 2014/15.

The Chairman of the Board of Directors of the Sports Limited Company established in 2013 is the Chinese citizen Xialong Ji, appointed by the company that owns the rights of the Sports Limited Company, Anping Football Limited, owned by Eric Mao.

There are several rumors that involve the Sports Limited Company in the handling of results, including in a UEFA report, a situation that contributes to the extreme relationship between club and Anping.

With the victory of Armando Hipólito in the elections of 2016, the club definitively cuts off relations with the Sports Limited Company, prohibiting the professional team to attend the facilities of the club.

The management of Armando Hipólito is marked by the deep economic crisis. The club loses the management of Alvito Municipal Pools, and in April the Board resigns, calling for early elections.

The following month, Ricardo Delgado wins the elections, heading a unique list, and is the current president of Atlético Clube de Portugal.

At the end of September 2017, the Sports Limited Company-managed team would be disqualified from the regional championship after missing two straight games.

Sport sections in activity

Football 
Football, since its foundation, has always been the most important sport in the Club.

After the break with the Sports Public Limited Company at the end of the 2015/16 season by the Armando Hipólito board, the Club inscribed a team in the Lisbon Football Association and is inserted in the 1st Division of the respective Association, taking the place of former reserve team of the Sports Public Limited Company, who had been champion of the 2nd Division in the previous season.

The season turns out to be frustrating, with Atlético failing the promotion by four points, seeing the neighbors of Santo António de Lisboa climb in a championship won by the team of Mem Martins.

In 2017/18 the Club announces that it will compete in the Women's Football, creating a team that competes in the Division of Promotion and in the Cup of Portugal.

In the youth the Club maintains teams that go from the under-10 to the under-19.

In 2021/22, the club reached promotion to Campeonato de Portugal after 4 years absence.

Basketball 
One of the most cherished sports by the associates, the senior team remains in the National Championship of the 1st Division, the third tier of the sport, after the relegation from Proliga, due to the fact of having refused to play in the LPB in 2016/17.

The Club also has activities in various levels, male and female, as well as mini-basketball.

Futsal 
Section in activity since 1986, Atlético was one of the powers of the sport, with two second places in the National Championship in 1991/92 and 1993/94, as well as three third places in 1992/93, 1999/00 and 2000 / 01.

However, the current reality is quite different, with the Club fighting for survival and being forced, for financial reasons, to start again from scratch. Atlético currently competes in the lowest division of the Lisbon Football Association, the 1st Division.

Ruben Simões, a UEFA Futsal Cup winner for Benfica in 2010, is the captain of the team.

The club also has a team in the youth level, which competes in the AFL Division of Honor U-19.

References

External links
Official site (Portuguese)
ZeroZero squad & stats
LPFP official page
ForaDeJogo.net profile

 
Sport in Lisbon
Association football clubs established in 1942
Taça de Portugal winners
1942 establishments in Portugal
Primeira Liga clubs
Liga Portugal 2 clubs
Football clubs in Portugal
Portuguese field hockey clubs